Anwar Hadi Ramli is a playwright and actor who has appeared in several TV films and theatre productions since 2000. He appeared in the 2008 Kallang Roar the Movie as Gelek King Dollah Kassim in Singapore national football team of the 1970s. He is currently working in theatre. In 2017, his play, The (Assumed) Vicious Cycle of a (Melayu) Youth, won the Best Theatre Script at the Anugerah Persuratan (Malay Literary Awards) by the Malay Language Council of Singapore.

Filmography
Kallang Roar the Movie (2008) .... Dollah Kassim
Blood Ties (2009) .... Nazri

Theatre
Keris Sempana Daik (2003) .... Majlis Pusat Teater Titisan
Hikayat Hang Tuah (2003) .... Teater Kami Ltd
Awang Batil (2003) .... Teater Kami Ltd
NSMen Life! (2003) .... Teater Kami Ltd
VIA 3 Dramatic reading (2004) .... Teater Ekamatra
Lelaki 9 Akal 1 Nafsu (2004) .... Teater Kami Ltd
Ainul Jauhara (2004) .... Majlis Pusat – Teater Titisan
Psikosis (2004) .... Teater Kami Ltd
VIA 4 Dramatic reading (2004) .... Teater Ekamatra
Mat Rock Minah Kental (2004) .... Teater Kami Ltd
Kelab Dangdut (2005) .... Teater Kami Ltd
Puteri Saadong (2005) .... Teater Kami Ltd
VIA 5 Dramatic reading (2005) .... Teater Ekamatra
Horlick Milo Kopi Teh (2005) .... Teater Kami Ltd
Rock Opera the Musical (2006) .... IMG Promotions
Bicara (2006) .... Teater Artistik
VIA 7 Dramatic reading (2006) .... Teater Ekamatra
Tekong Highway (200) .... Teater Kami Ltd
Mat Champion the Musical (2007) .... Teater Ekamatra
Al-Kisah Jakun dan Tengek (2007) .... Teater Kami Ltd
Gentarasa Titisan Cacamerba (2007) .... MESRA
Balada Tun Fatimah (2007) .... Teater Kami Ltd
Adventures of Han and Geet (2007) .... Act3 Theatrics
Wayang Betul..Lah (2007) .... Teater Kami Ltd
Campur Satu (2007) .... Teater Kami Ltd
Awang Batil (2008) .... ACJC
Robinson Crusoe (2008) .... Act3 Theatrics
Treasury of Singapore Tales (2008) .... Act3 Theatrics
Love Story of Romzi and Juleha (2008) .... Teater Kami Ltd
Badang Returns (2008) .... Teater Kami Ltd
Sidang Burung (2008) .... Teater Ekamatra
The Assumed Vicious Cycle of a Malay Youth (TVCY) (2016) ... Pentas Karyawan
Claustrophobia (2017) ... Pentas Karyawan
Mahameru (2018) ... Pentas Karyawan
Kurun Yang Hilang (2019) ... Pentas Karyawan

References

1970 births
Living people
Singaporean male film actors
21st-century Singaporean male actors
Singaporean male stage actors
Singaporean male television actors